The Stepmother's Tragedy is a play written by Henry Chettle and Thomas Dekker. It is mentioned in Philip Henslowe's diary in August 1599. No extant copies of the play are known.

British plays
1590s plays
Lost plays